Tessema may refer to:
Tessema Absher, the Ethiopian long-distance runner.
Tessema Nadew
Ydnekatchew Tessema, the former Ethiopian president of the Confederation of African Football, footballer and manager.
Tessema (moth), a moth genus in the family Crambidae.